Join, or Die is a 2003 compilation album by Amen. It was the first album published by the Refuse Music label and was limited to 2000 copies with the first 1000 copies hand numbered by Casey Chaos in his blood. The album features rare songs and b-sides, and was sold during the band's 2003 tour of the United Kingdom. In 2006, the album was re-released in 2006 with a run of an additional 2000 copies with, just like before, the first 1000 numbered by Casey Chaos in his blood.

Track listing
All lyrics and instruments were by Casey Chaos.

References

Amen (American band) albums
Albums produced by Ross Robinson
2003 compilation albums
Punk rock compilation albums